WWLD (102.3 FM) is an Urban Contemporary formatted radio station licensed to Cairo, Georgia, and serving the Tallahassee, Florida, market and surrounding areas. The station is owned by Cumulus Media. According to Radio and Records, WWLD is now the highest-rated radio station in the Tallahassee market.  Its studios are located in the westside of Tallahassee and its transmitter is based due north of downtown along I-10.

External links
WWLD official website

WLD
Urban contemporary radio stations in the United States
Radio stations established in 1975
Cumulus Media radio stations
1975 establishments in Georgia (U.S. state)